The World of Suzie Wong is a 1960 British-American romantic drama film directed by Richard Quine and starring William Holden and Nancy Kwan. The screenplay by John Patrick was adapted from the 1958 stage play by Paul Osborn, which was based on the 1957 novel of the same title by Richard Mason.

Plot
American architect Robert Lomax (William Holden) moves to Hong Kong for a year to see if he can make a living as a painter. Whilst aboard the Star Ferry, en route to Hong Kong Island, he meets a smartly dressed young woman of seemingly lofty social status. She eventually introduces herself as Mei Ling (Nancy Kwan) and says that her father is very wealthy. When the ferry docks, they go their separate ways.

With limited financial resources, Robert looks for an inexpensive room in the teeming Wan Chai district, a poor area known for prostitution. By chance, he sees Mei Ling leaving the run-down Nam Kok Hotel. When he inquires inside, the hotel owner replies that he does not know any Mei Ling, but responds excitedly to Robert's request to rent a room for a whole month, unlike the usual hourly rate. Robert eventually goes into the bar adjoining the hotel, where he sees Mei Ling again, this time dressed in a slinky red cheongsam and in the company of a sailor. He learns her real name is Suzie Wong and that she is the bar's most popular girl.

The following day, Robert visits a banker to set up an account. The banker's secretary and daughter, Kay O'Neill (Sylvia Syms), is immediately attracted to the newcomer.

Robert asks Suzie to model for him. As they become better acquainted, he learns she was forced into prostitution as a means of survival after being abandoned when she was ten years old. Suzie begins to fall in love with Robert, but he tries to dissuade her, although he continues to use her as his muse. Meanwhile, he is also pursued discreetly by Kay. One night after a party at her house, Robert takes Kay to his room to see his paintings and is embarrassed to find Suzie on the bed. After Kay departs, Robert orders Suzie out, but as she descends the staircase she is beaten by a sailor whom she had spurned earlier in the night. Enraged, Robert punches the sailor.

One of Suzie's customers, Ben, offers to make Suzie his mistress, and she accepts in order to make Robert jealous. When Ben reconciles with his wife, he asks Robert to break the news to Suzie. She is so hurt by the rejection that Robert finally admits he loves her and asks her to stay with him.

Soon the couple is living together in the hotel, with Robert painting more enthusiastically than ever. He begins to grow curious, however, about Suzie's daily absences, and one morning, follows her up a hillside path to a small house, where he finds her visiting her infant son, whom she has kept hidden. Robert accepts the child.

When his paintings fail to sell, Robert finds himself facing financial difficulties, and both Kay and Suzie offer to give him money, but his pride will not let him accept. When Suzie pays his rent and offers to resume working as a prostitute to help him, he drives her away in a fit of anger.

Robert quickly regrets his actions and spends days searching for Suzie. Kay tells Robert that one of his paintings of Suzie sold in London. Robert reveals that he has lost Suzie, and Kay, misunderstanding, assures him he can find another model, and pursues Robert herself, only to be spurned by him.

Robert finally finds Suzie waiting for him outside the hotel. She asks him to help her retrieve her son, who is in danger due to the heavy rains. Robert and Suzie force their way up the hillside, only to discover that Suzie's son has been killed in a landslide.

After the temple ceremony for her son, Robert asks Suzie to marry him, and they leave the temple together.

Cast
 William Holden as Robert Lomax
 Nancy Kwan as Suzie Wong
 Sylvia Syms as Kay O'Neill
 Michael Wilding as Ben Marlowe
 Laurence Naismith as O'Neill
 Andy Ho as Ah Tong
 Jacqui Chan as Gwennie Lee
 Yvonne Shima as Minnie Ho

Production

France Nuyen, who had played the role of Suzie Wong in the Broadway production opposite William Shatner and was familiar to film audiences from her appearance in South Pacific, originally signed to reprise the role on screen. After five weeks of location shooting in Hong Kong, the cast and crew – including original director Jean Negulesco – moved to London to film interiors.

Nuyen was involved romantically with Marlon Brando at the time, and his rumoured affair with Barbara Luna was causing her distress. She began to overeat, and before long was unable to fit into the body-hugging silk cheongsams her character was required to wear. Unwilling to halt production until she could get her weight under control, executive producer Ray Stark replaced her with Nancy Kwan, who was touring the United States and Canada as the understudy to the lead in the road company performing the play. Stark had auditioned her for the film but at the time thought she was too inexperienced to handle the lead.

Stark also fired Negulesco and replaced him with Richard Quine. Everyone involved in the completed Hong Kong scenes was required to return to reshoot them with Kwan, and all the unpublished publicity with Nuyen, including an article and photo layout for Esquire, had to be redone.

The film's title song was written by Sammy Cahn and Jimmy Van Heusen. Artist Dong Kingman acted as the film's technical advisor and painted sets for the film. The movie features location filming in Hong Kong, and art direction and production design by John Box, Syd Cain, Liz Moore, Roy Rossotti and R.L.M. Davidson at the MGM British Studios.

Sylvia Syms had just made Ferry to Hong Kong in Hong Kong.

stunt coordinator Peter Diamond, uncredited. Ray Austin William Holden's stunt double uncredited

The film premiered at Radio City Music Hall in New York City.

Locations
Although set in Wanchai, the film featured locations from around Hong Kong, sometimes misrepresenting their geographical proximity for cinematic effect. The film serves as a valuable historical record of 1960s Hong Kong. Locations seen in the film include Tsim Sha Tsui, Central/Sheung Wan (especially around Ladder Street), Yau Ma Tei, Sai Ying Pun, Aberdeen and Telegraph Bay.

Critical reception and reputation
On Rotten Tomatoes, the film has an approval rating of 38% based on eight reviews, with an average rating of 5.75 out of 10.

When the film was released it attracted a mixed response. Bosley Crowther of The New York Times observed that sceptics could assume "that what we have here is a tale so purely idealized in the telling that it wafts into the realm of sheer romance. But the point is that idealization is accomplished so unrestrainedly and with such open reliance upon the impact of elemental clichés that it almost builds up the persuasiveness of real sincerity. Unless you shut your eyes and start thinking, you might almost believe it to be true." And a new girl named Nancy Kwan plays her so blithely and innocently that even the ladies should love her. She and the scenery are the best things in the film."

Variety said, "Holden gives a first-class performance, restrained and sincere. He brings authority and compassion to the role. Kwan is not always perfect in her timing of lines (she has a tendency to anticipate) and appears to lack a full range of depth or warmth, but on the whole she manages a fairly believable portrayal."

Some years after the film's release, the London listing magazine Time Out commented that because the film is "denied the chance of being honest about its subject, it soon degenerates into euphemistic soap opera, with vague gestures towards bohemianism and lukewarm titillation."

In 2013, the Japanese American Citizens League called out Katy Perry's geisha-styled performance on the American Music Awards, as "the latest rendition of the bad movie we've all seen before. There is a persistent strain in our culture that refuses to move beyond the stereotype of Asian women as exotic and subservient. These stereotypes have been reinforced in our popular culture through plays and movies from our distant past such as Madame Butterfly and The World of Suzie Wong."

Awards and nominations
Nancy Kwan was nominated for the Golden Globe Award for Best Actress – Motion Picture Drama but lost to Greer Garson in Sunrise at Campobello. George Duning was nominated for the Golden Globe Award for Best Original Score but lost to Dimitri Tiomkin for The Alamo.

DVD release
The film was released on Region 1 DVD on June 29, 2004. It is in anamorphic widescreen format with an audio track and subtitles in English.

See also
 List of American films of 1960

References

External links

 
 
 
 "Hong Kong as City/Imaginary in The World of Suzie Wong, Love is a Many Splendored Thing, and Chinese Box", by Thomas Y. T. Luk, The Chinese University of Hong Kong
 Gwulo: Old Hong Kong (The World of Suzie Wong (1960))
 17 movie stills, some of them giving a glimpse of real Hong Kong life in the late 1950s

1960 films
1960 romantic drama films
British romantic drama films
American romantic drama films
Films about Chinese Americans
Films scored by George Duning
Films about fictional painters
Films about interracial romance
Films about prostitution in Hong Kong
Films based on British novels
Films based on adaptations
British films based on plays
American films based on plays
Films directed by Richard Quine
Films set in Hong Kong
Paramount Pictures films
Films shot at MGM-British Studios
1960s English-language films
1960s American films
1960s British films